Deserving Design is a half-hour show on the Home and Garden TV network, starring Vern Yip.  In each episode an inspirational family or individual is visited by Yip, who show him two different rooms they would like to have redesigned.  Yip will pick one of the rooms to do and have the person or family aid in its design. However, Yip always surprises them by secretly redoing the other room, usually while covertly having them offer input into it, or by giving them some other special gift.

Host
Formerly a designer on The Learning Channels's Trading Spaces, Vern Yip has acted as a judge on HGTV's "The Next Design Star" for  the 2006 to 2012 competitions. Deserving Design is Yip's first solo show and he considers it to be his "best work yet."  The idea for the show came to Yip after he made an appearance on Oprah where he helped do a home project for a waitress and her mother, and he hopes it will both entertain and inspire viewers.

Episode list
The first season's episodes are being aired out of order from their actual production numbers. This list presents them in the order of production.

References

External links
Deserving Design on HGTV
 

2007 American television series debuts
2000s American reality television series
2007 American television series endings
HGTV original programming